Surtsey ("Surtr's island" in Icelandic) is a volcanic island located in the Vestmannaeyjar archipelago off the southern coast of Iceland. At  Surtsey is the southernmost point of Iceland.

The new island was named after Surtr, a fire jötunn or giant from Norse mythology. It was intensively studied by volcanologists during its eruption, and afterwards by botanists and other biologists as life forms gradually colonised the originally barren island. The undersea vents that produced Surtsey are part of the Vestmannaeyjar submarine volcanic system, part of the fissure of the sea floor called the Mid-Atlantic Ridge. Vestmannaeyjar also produced the famous eruption of Eldfell on the island of Heimaey in 1973. The eruption that created Surtsey also created a few other small islands along this volcanic chain, such as Jólnir and other, unnamed peaks. Most of these eroded away fairly quickly. It is estimated that Surtsey will remain above sea level until at least the year 2100.

Geology

Formation

The eruption was unexpected, and almost certainly began some days before it became apparent at the surface. Gradually, as repeated flows built up a mound of material that approached sea level, the explosions could no longer be contained, and activity broke the surface.

Another station in Reykjavík recorded even weaker tremors for ten hours on 12 November at an undetermined location, when seismic activity ceased until 21 November. On 13 November, a fishing vessel in search of herring, equipped with sensitive thermometers, noted sea temperatures  SW of the eruption center were  higher than surrounding waters.

Eruption at the surface

At 07:15 UTC on 14 November 1963, the cook of Ísleifur II, a trawler sailing these same waters, spotted a rising column of dark smoke southwest of the boat. The captain thought it might have been a boat on fire, and ordered his crew to investigate. Instead, they encountered explosive eruptions giving off black columns of ash, indicating that a volcanic eruption had begun to breach the surface of the sea. By 11:00 the same day, the eruption column had reached several kilometres in height. At first the eruptions took place at three separate vents along a northeast by southwest trending fissure, but by the afternoon the separate eruption columns had merged into one along the erupting fissure.

As the eruptions continued, they became concentrated at one vent along the fissure and began to build the island into a more circular shape. The violent explosions caused by the meeting of lava and sea water meant that the island consisted of a loose pile of volcanic rock (scoria), which was eroded rapidly by North Atlantic storms during the winter.

The explosive phreatomagmatic eruptions caused by the easy access of water to the erupting vents threw rocks up to a kilometre (0.6 mi) away from the island, and sent ash clouds as high as  up into the atmosphere. The loose pile of unconsolidated tephra would quickly have been washed away had the supply of fresh magma dwindled, and large clouds of dust were often seen blowing away from the island during this stage of the eruption.

The new island was named after the fire jötunn Surtur from Norse mythology (Surts is the genitive case of Surtur, plus -ey, island). Three French journalists representing the magazine Paris Match notably landed there on 6 December 1963, staying for about 15 minutes before violent explosions encouraged them to leave. The journalists jokingly claimed French sovereignty over the island, but Iceland quickly asserted that the new island belonged to it.

Permanent island
By early 1964, though, the continuing eruptions had built the island to such a size that sea water could no longer easily reach the vents, and the volcanic activity became much less explosive. Instead, lava fountains and flows became the main form of activity. These resulted in a hard cap of extremely erosion-resistant rock being laid down on top of much of the loose volcanic pile, which prevented the island from being washed away rapidly.

This seamount was named Surtla , but never reached sea level.

Subsequent volcanic activity

By 28 May, an island had appeared, and was named Syrtlingur ( Little Surtsey). The new island was washed away during early June, but reappeared on 14 June. Eruptions at Syrtlingur were much smaller in scale than those that had built Surtsey, with the average rate of emission of volcanic materials being about a tenth of the rate at the main vent. Once the eruptions had ceased, wave erosion rapidly wore the island away, and it disappeared beneath the waves on 24 October.

It was named Jólnir, and over the following eight months it appeared and disappeared several times, as wave erosion and volcanic activity alternated in dominance. Like Syrtlingur, though, after activity ceased on 8 August 1966, it was rapidly eroded, and dropped below sea level during October 1966.

Effusive eruptions on the main island returned on 19 August 1966, with fresh lava flows giving it further resistance to erosion. The eruption rate diminished steadily, though, and on 5 June 1967, the eruption ended. The volcano has been dormant ever since.

Since the end of the eruption, erosion has seen the island diminish in size. A large area on the southeast side has been eroded away completely, while a sand spit called Norðurtangi (north point) has grown on the north side of the island.

Recent development

Following the end of the eruption, scientists established a grid of benchmarks against which they measured the change in the shape of the island. In the 20 years following the end of the eruption, measurements revealed that the island was steadily subsiding and had lost about one metre in height. It had several causes: settling of the loose tephra forming the bulk of the volcano, compaction of sea floor sediments underlying the island, and downward warping of the lithosphere due to the weight of the volcano.

Volcanoes in the Vestmannaeyjar archipelago are typically monogenetic, and so the island is unlikely to be enlarged in the future by further eruptions. The heavy seas around the island have been eroding it ever since the island appeared, and since the end of the eruption almost half of its original area has been lost.

Future

As a suspected part of the Iceland plume, this island is unlikely to disappear entirely in the near future. The eroded area consisted mostly of loose tephra, easily washed away. Most of the remaining area is capped by hard lava flows, which are much more resistant to erosion. In addition, complex chemical reactions within the loose tephra within the island have gradually formed highly erosion-resistant tuff material, in a process known as palagonitization. On Surtsey, this process has happened quite rapidly, due to high temperatures not far below the surface.

Estimates of how long Surtsey will survive are based on the rate of erosion seen up to the present day. Assuming that the current rate does not change, the island will be mostly at or below sea level by 2100. However, the rate of erosion is likely to slow as the tougher core of the island is exposed: an assessment assuming that the rate of erosion will slow exponentially suggests that the island will survive for many centuries. An idea of what it will look like in the future is given by the other small islands in the Vestmannaeyjar archipelago, which formed in the same way as Surtsey several thousand years ago, and have eroded away substantially since they were formed.

Biology

Settlement of life
A classic site for the study of biocolonisation from founder populations, Surtsey was declared a nature reserve in 1965, while the eruption was still in progress. Today only a few scientists are permitted to land on Surtsey; the only way anyone else can see it closely is from a small plane. This allows the natural ecological succession for the island to proceed without outside interference. In 2008, UNESCO declared the island a World Heritage Site, in recognition of its great scientific value.

Plant life
In the spring of 1965, the first vascular plant was found growing on the northern shore of Surtsey, mosses became visible in 1967, and lichens were first found on the Surtsey lava in 1970. Plant colonisation on Surtsey has been closely studied, the vascular plants in particular as they have been of far greater significance than mosses, lichens and fungi in the development of vegetation.

Mosses and lichens now cover much of the island. During the island's first 20 years, 20 species of plants were observed at one time or another, but only 10 became established in the nutrient-poor sandy soil. As birds began nesting on the island, soil conditions improved, and more vascular plant species were able to survive. By 2008, 69 species of plant had been found on Surtsey, of which about 30 had become established. This compares to the approximately 490 species found on mainland Iceland. More species continue to arrive, at a typical rate of roughly 2–5 new species per year.

Bird life

The expansion of bird life on the island has both relied on and helped to advance the spread of plant life. Birds use the plants for nesting material, but also continue to assist in the spreading of seeds, and fertilize the soil with their guano. Birds first began nesting on Surtsey three years after the eruptions ended, with fulmar and guillemot the first species to set up home. Twelve species are now regularly found on the island.

A gull colony has been present since 1984, although gulls were seen briefly on the shores of the new island weeks after it first appeared. The gull colony has been particularly important in developing the plant life on Surtsey, and the gulls have had much more of an impact on plant colonisation than other breeding species due to their abundance. An expedition in 2004 found the first evidence of nesting Atlantic puffins, which are abundant in the rest of the archipelago.

As well as providing a home for some species of birds, Surtsey has also been used as a stopping-off point for migrating birds, particularly those en route between Europe and Iceland. Species that have been seen briefly on the island include whooper swans, various species of geese, and common ravens. Although Surtsey lies to the west of the main migration routes to Iceland, it has become a more common stopping point as its vegetation has improved. In 2008, the 14th breeding bird species was detected with the discovery of a common raven's nest.

According to a 30 May 2009 report, a golden plover was nesting on the island, with four eggs.

Marine life
Soon after the island's formation, seals were seen around the island. They soon began basking there, particularly on the northern spit, which grew as the waves eroded the island. Seals were found to be breeding on the island in 1983, and a group of up to 70 made the island their breeding spot. Grey seals are more common on the island than harbour seals, but both are now well established. The presence of seals attracts orcas, which are frequently seen in the waters around the Vestmannaeyjar archipelago and now frequent the waters around Surtsey.

On the submarine portion of the island, many marine species are found. Starfish are abundant, as are sea urchins and limpets.

Other life

Insects arrived on Surtsey soon after its formation, and were first detected in 1964. The original arrivals were flying insects, carried to the island by winds and their own power. Some were believed to have been blown across from as far away as mainland Europe. Later insect life arrived on floating driftwood, and both live animals and carcasses washed up on the island. When a large, grass-covered tussock washed ashore in 1974, scientists took half of it for analysis and discovered 663 land invertebrates, mostly mites and springtails, the great majority of which had survived the crossing.

The establishment of insect life provided some food for birds, and birds in turn helped many species to become established on the island. The bodies of dead birds provide sustenance for carnivorous insects, while the fertilisation of the soil and resulting promotion of plant life provides a viable habitat for herbivorous insects.

The first earthworm was found in a soil sample in 1993, probably carried over from Heimaey by a bird. However, the next year no earthworms were found. Slugs were found in 1998, and appeared to be similar to varieties found in the southern Icelandic mainland. Spiders and beetles have also become established.

Human impact
The only significant human impact is a small prefabricated hut which is used by researchers while staying on the island. The hut includes a few bunk beds and a solar power source to drive an emergency radio and other key electronics. There is also an abandoned lighthouse foundation. All visitors check themselves and belongings to ensure no seeds are accidentally introduced by humans to this ecosystem. It is believed that some boys who sneaked over from Heimaey by rowboat planted potatoes, which were promptly dug up once discovered. An improperly managed human defecation resulted in a tomato plant taking root, which was also destroyed.
In 2009, a weather station for weather observations and a webcam were installed on Surtsey.

See also

Geography of Iceland
List of islands of Iceland
List of new islands
List of volcanoes in Iceland
Volcanism of Iceland

References

External links

The Surtsey Research Society
Weather observations on Surtsey
Webcam on Surtsey
Aerial photos, maps and volcanic geology of Surtsey.
Visit Westman Islands
Surtsey Topography
The Surtsey Research Society , which administers the island
A notice from the Environmental & Food Agency declaring Surtsey a protected area 
Explore North site illustrates postage stamps.
Extensive information about plant and bird life on the island
"Surtsey, Iceland" in Coastal World Heritage Sites, pp 237-242

1963 in Iceland
Volcanic eruptions in Iceland
1963 natural disasters
20th-century volcanic events
New islands
Uninhabited islands of Iceland
Volcanoes of Iceland
World Heritage Sites in Iceland
Active volcanoes
Vestmannaeyjar
Islands of Iceland